The Mortland Family Farm is a historic farmstead  on Mortland Road in Searsport, Maine.  Begun in 1834 and altered and enlarged until about 1950, it is a well-preserved example of a New England connected farmstead, a property type that has become increasingly rare in Maine.  The farm, at  a fraction of its greatest extent, was listed on the National Register of Historic Places in 1991.

Description and history
The Mortland Family Farm is located in rural inland Searsport, on the east side of Mortland Road.  Surviving elements of the farmstead include the 1834 Greek Revival stone Cape style farmhouse, two 19th-century barns, and wood-frame ells joining the elements.  A modern (1950s) dairy shed is attached to one of the barns, and the  also includes a cellar hole believed to be the site of the first house on the property.  The property includes two meadows, formerly in agricultural use, and a remnant apple orchard.

The property was first settled in the 1820s by the family of Samuel Mortland, an Irish immigrant, who at first lived in a crude log structure. In 1834 he built the surviving rubblestone Cape. The property was owned by five generations of Mortlands, and was sold out of the family in 1985. The barns were added in the 1890s, one of them built with materials salvaged from a nearby older barn. In the 20th century the farm was primarily as a dairy operation.

See also
National Register of Historic Places listings in Waldo County, Maine

References

Farms on the National Register of Historic Places in Maine
Greek Revival architecture in Maine
Commercial buildings completed in 1834
Buildings and structures in Waldo County, Maine
National Register of Historic Places in Waldo County, Maine
Historic districts on the National Register of Historic Places in Maine